Wilhelm Trautschold (1815–1877) was a German portrait painter.

Trautschold was born in Berlin on 2 June 1815. He lived in London from 1860.

His works are in the collections of the National Portrait Gallery, and the Royal Society of Chemistry. One of his paintings of Justus von Liebig was used on a German 100 Reichsmark note in 1935.

He died in Munich on 7 January 1877. He was brother of paleontologist Hermann Trautschold.

References

External references 
 

1815 births
1877 deaths
German portrait painters
Artists from Berlin
19th-century German painters
19th-century German male artists
German expatriates in the United Kingdom